Go Live may refer to:

 Go Live (album), a 2020 album by South Korean boy group Stray Kids
 "Go Live" (song), its track
 Go Live (EP), a 2019 EP by South Korean–Japanese boy group ONF